Harald Rose  (born 14 February 1935 in Bremen) is a German physicist.

Rose received in 1964 his physics Diplom in theoretical electron optics under Otto Scherzer at the Technische Universität Darmstadt. From 1976 to 1980 he was principal research scientist at The New York State department of Health. In 1973–1974 he spent one research year at the Enrico Fermi Institute of the  University of Chicago and in 1995–1996 one research year at Cornell and the University of Maryland. From 1980 to his retirement in 2000 as professor emeritus, he was active at the University of Darmstadt in the Physics Department. Since 2009 he has held a Carl Zeiss funded Senior Professorship at the University of Ulm. Rose has 105 patents of scientific instruments and electrooptical components.

Awards and honors
 since 1987 Honorary Professor of the Xi'an Jiaotong University, China
 2003 Distinguished Scientist Award of the Microscopy Society of America
 2006 Karl Heinz Beckurts Prize (together with Maximilian Haider and Knut Urban)
 2008 Honda Prize (together with Maximilian Haider and Knut Urban)
 2008 Honorary Fellow of the Royal Society of Microscopy (Hon FRMS)
 2009 Robert Wichard Pohl Prize
 2011 Wolf Prize for Physics (together with Maximilian Haider and Knut Urban)
 2013 BBVA Foundation Frontiers of Knowledge Award in Basic Sciences (together with Maximilian Haider and Knut Urban)
 2020 Kavli Prize in Nanoscience (together with Maximilian Haider and Knut Urban and Ondrej Krivanek).

Publications

References

Further reading

External links

1935 births
Living people
Scientists from Bremen
20th-century German physicists
Wolf Prize in Physics laureates
Academic staff of the University of Ulm
Technische Universität Darmstadt alumni
Academic staff of Technische Universität Darmstadt
Kavli Prize laureates in Nanoscience
21st-century German physicists